The 1981 Jackson State Tigers football team represented Jackson State University as a member of the Southwestern Athletic Conference (SWAC) during the 1981 NCAA Division I-AA football season. Led by sixth-year head coach W. C. Gorden, the Tigers compiled and overall record of 9–2–1 with a mark of 5–1 in conference play, winning the SWAC title. Jackson State advanced to the NCAA Division I-AA Championship playoffs, where they lost to Boise State in the quarterfinals.

Schedule

References

Jackson State
Jackson State Tigers football seasons
Southwestern Athletic Conference football champion seasons
Jackson State Tigers football